Somatidia grandis is a species of beetle in the family Cerambycidae. It was described by Broun in 1895. It contains the varietas Somatidia grandis var. placita.

References

grandis
Beetles described in 1895